Orphan's Tragedy is the seventh studio album by the Minneapolis-based noise rock band The Cows. It was released on September 9, 1994, by Amphetamine Reptile Records.

Track listing

Personnel
Adapted from the Orphan's Tragedy liner notes.

Cows
 Thor Eisentrager – guitar
 Norm Rogers – drums
 Kevin Rutmanis – bass guitar
 Shannon Selberg – vocals, bugle

Production and additional personnel
 Iain Burgess – production, engineering
 Peter Deimel - production, engineering
 Tom Hazelmyer – design
 John Largaespada – cover art
 Günter Pauler – mastering

Release history

References

External links 
 

1994 albums
Albums produced by Iain Burgess
Amphetamine Reptile Records albums
Cows (band) albums